Leopoldine Rysanek (14 November 1926 – 7 March 1998) was an Austrian dramatic soprano.

Life 
Rysanek was born in Vienna and made her operatic debut in 1949 in Innsbruck. In 1951 the Bayreuth Festival reopened and the new leader Wieland Wagner asked her to sing Sieglinde in Die Walküre. He was convinced that her unique, young and beautiful voice, combined with her rare acting abilities, would create a sensation. She became a star overnight, and the role of Sieglinde followed her for the rest of her career. Her final performance was at the Salzburg Festival in August 1996, as Klytämnestra in Elektra by Richard Strauss.

Her Metropolitan Opera debut came in 1959 as Lady Macbeth in Verdi's Macbeth, replacing Maria Callas who had been "fired" from the production. Over her lengthy career, she sang 299 performances of 24 roles there. She starred in productions of Verdi's Nabucco, in the title role of Ariadne auf Naxos by Richard Strauss, the Empress in Die Frau ohne Schatten, also by Strauss, and Janáček's Káťa Kabanová. She made her farewell there as the Countess in Tchaikovsky's The Queen of Spades in January 1996. 

She was appointed curator of the Vienna Festival a few months after her retirement, a post she held until her death in Vienna at age 71 (she had been diagnosed with bone cancer during her last Met performances). Two days later, a Metropolitan Opera production of Wagner's Lohengrin with Ben Heppner in the title role was dedicated to her memory. In that opera, she had sung the role of Ortrud in the 1985–86 production.

Voice and roles
Leonie Rysanek's voice is regarded as in-line with the spinto and dramatic soprano categories. Although her voice fell in the upper end of the jugendlich-dramatisch and dramatischer Sopran categories in the German repertoire, it was exclusively dramatic by Italian operatic standards. Her endurance in the high tessitura of Strauss' operas is widely praised. 

She is known for singing the music of Richard Strauss. She was especially praised as the Empress (Kaiserin) in Die Frau ohne Schatten, the title role in Salome, the Marschallin in Der Rosenkavalier and Chrysothemis in Elektra. She occasionally sang Ariadne/Prima Donna in Ariadne auf Naxos and female leads in Strauss operas rarely staged (Die ägyptische Helena and Die Liebe der Danae). However, cautious of playing out of her league, she didn't tackle Salome until 1972 when she was age 46, although she kept the role of Sieglinde in her active repertoire from her early 20s until age 62. She avoided offers to sing Isolde in Wagner's Tristan und Isolde despite speculation that the role would be perfect for her. She sang Brünnhilde in Die Walküre in 1950 in Innsbruck but did not return to this role. She stated in interviews that her great respect for her colleague Birgit Nilsson was a factor in her avoidance of that soprano's signature roles. One of her performances in Die Walküre took place in the same week as her appearance as Gilda in Rigoletto. 

Rysanek sang the title role of Tosca often, and Turandot a few times. She also sang Leonore in Beethoven's Fidelio.

In Wagner, she sang Elisabeth in Tannhäuser often, also Elsa and Ortrud in Lohengrin. She is highly regarded for her portrayal of Senta in Der fliegende Holländer for two decades, but the role in which she was most revered, in addition to Strauss's Kaiserin and Chrysothemis, was Sieglinde in Die Walküre.

Due to Rysanek's vocal technique and strong vocal endurance she was able to sing many Verdi leads, notably Desdemona in Otello, Lady Macbeth, Amelia in Un ballo in maschera, Elisabetta in Don Carlo, Leonora in La forza del destino, and the title role of Aida. She also sang Abigaille in the Metropolitan Opera's first staging of Nabucco in 1960. She found this last role uncongenial, and the strain of performing it numerous times during that season brought on something of a vocal crisis, from which she successfully recovered.  

As an Austrian and a Mitteleuropäerin, Rysanek also took an interest in music from Slavic countries, both Russian (Tchaikovsky) and Czech (Smetana, Janáček).

Rysanek sang Turandot and was praised in her role of Kundry in Parsifal at the Met, Vienna, and the Bayreuth Festival.  Starting her career when Kirsten Flagstad was still alive and Birgit Nilsson and Astrid Varnay at the peak of their vocal abilities. In 1981, Karl Böhm persuaded her to sing Elektra for a Unitel film (with the soundtrack recorded in the studio), not a live production in an opera house.

In her later years, Rysanek reverted to dramatic mezzo-soprano roles like Herodias in Salome, Klytemnestra in Elektra and the Kostelnička in Janáček's Jenůfa.

Soprano Lotte Rysanek was Leopoldine Rysanek's sister.

Officially published recordings
Work (composer), role, conductor, year of recording, label.

Die Walküre Act III (Richard Wagner), Sieglinde, Herbert von Karajan, 1951, EMI
Die Walküre (Richard Wagner), Sieglinde, Wilhelm Furtwängler, 1954, EMI
Die Frau ohne Schatten (Richard Strauss), Kaiserin, Karl Böhm, 1955, Decca
Fidelio (Ludwig van Beethoven), Leonore, Ferenc Fricsay, 1957, Deutsche Grammophon
Operatic Arias, Arturo Basile, 1958, RCA Victor
Ariadne auf Naxos (Richard Strauss), Prima Donna/Ariadne, Erich Leinsdorf, 1958, Decca
Macbeth (Giuseppe Verdi), Lady Macbeth, Erich Leinsdorf, 1959, RCA Victor
Otello (Giuseppe Verdi), Desdemona, Tullio Serafin, 1960, RCA Victor
Requiem (Giuseppe Verdi), soprano, Herbert von Karajan, 1960, EMI
Der fliegende Holländer (Richard Wagner), Senta, Antal Doráti, 1961, Decca
Die Frau ohne Schatten (Richard Strauss), Kaiserin, Herbert von Karajan, 1964, Deutsche Grammophon
Die Walküre (Richard Wagner), Sieglinde, Karl Böhm, 1967, Philips
Medea (Luigi Cherubini), Medea, Horst Stein, 1972, RCA
Salome (Richard Strauss), Salome, Karl Böhm, 1972, RCA
Die Frau ohne Schatten (Richard Strauss), Kaiserin, Karl Böhm, 1977, Deutsche Grammophon
Elektra (Richard Strauss), Elektra, Karl Böhm, 1981, Unitel (video)
Jenůfa (Leoš Janáček), Kostelnicka, Eve Queler, 1988, BIS
Salome (Richard Strauss), Herodias, Giuseppe Sinopoli, 1990, Deutsche Grammophon
Elektra (Richard Strauss), Klytaemnestra, Jeffrey Tate, 1990, Claves
Elektra (Richard Strauss), Klytaemnestra, Friedemann Layer, 1995, Actes Sud Musicales

Other recordings
Senta in Der fliegende Holländer: Bayreuth Festival 1959, cond. Wolfgang Sawallisch.
Sieglinde in Die Walküre: Bayreuth Festival 1958, cond. Hans Knappertsbusch.
Title role in Salome: Chorégies d'Orange 1974, cond. Rudolf Kempe.
 Gioconda in La Gioconda: Berlin Staatsoper, 1974, cond. Giuseppe Patanè.
Chrysothemis in Elektra: Cologne Radio 1953, cond. Richard Kraus, Bavarian State Opera 1955, cond. Karl Böhm.
Elisabeth in Tannhäuser: Bayreuth Festival 1964, cond. Otmar Suitner and 1966, cond. Carlos Melles.
Elsa in Lohengrin: Bayreuth Festival 1958, cond. André Cluytens.
Danae in Die Liebe der Danae (Richard Strauss): Bavarian State Opera 1953, cond. Kurt Eichhorn.
Helena in Die Ägyptische Helena (Richard Strauss): Bavarian State Opera 1956, cond. Joseph Keilberth.
Title role in Aida (Giuseppe Verdi): Vienna Opera 1955, cond. Rafael Kubelík.
Amelia in Un ballo in maschera (Giuseppe Verdi): Metropolitan Opera 1962, cond. Nello Santi.

Decorations and awards

 1956: Österreichische Kammersängerin
 1956: Bayerische Kammersängerin
 1956: Silver rose of the Vienna Philharmonic
 1986: Honorary Ring of the Vienna
 1991: Commander of the Order of Arts and Letters (France)
 1996: Grand Gold Decoration for Services to the Republic of Austria
 Austrian Cross of Honour for Science and Art, 1st class

Honorary memberships
 1974: Honorary member of the Vienna State Opera
 1984: Honorary member of the Metropolitan Opera
 1986: Honorary member of the San Francisco Opera
 1994: Honorary member of the Opéra de Marseille

References

External links
Interview with Leonie Rysanek by Bruce Duffie, 25 June 1986

1926 births
1998 deaths
Austrian operatic sopranos
Burials at the Vienna Central Cemetery
Commandeurs of the Ordre des Arts et des Lettres
Recipients of the Grand Decoration for Services to the Republic of Austria
Recipients of the Austrian Cross of Honour for Science and Art, 1st class
Österreichischer Kammersänger
Austrian people of Czech descent
20th-century Austrian women opera singers